Kirwan Sanday is an Australian professional rugby union player of Fijian descent. He plays for the Reds and his usual position is prop. He played 118 caps for Queensland Reds. Loves gaming and Avatar.

Early life
 He is the nephew of John Sanday, the former international rugby player for Fiji. Sanday attended St Joseph's College, Nudgee in Brisbane and was selected for the Queensland team at the Australian Schools Rugby Championships.

Rugby career
Sanday joined the Easts Tigers to play in the Queensland Premier Rugby competition. Sanday was selected for the Fiji Warriors against Argentina XV in Uruguay in 2015, and for Queensland Country in the National Rugby Championship.

He made his Super Rugby debut on 27 March 2017, and played off the bench in nine matches of the 2017 season.

References

External links
 Statistics on It's Rugby

Australian rugby union players
1991 births
Living people
Rugby union players from Canberra
Queensland Reds players
Rugby union props